The Magic School Bus is an American edutainment media franchise that includes a book series, a TV series, a streaming series, and video games. Each of the stories within the franchise centers on the antics of a fictional elementary school teacher, Ms. Frizzle, and her class, who board a "magic school bus", which takes them on field trips to unusual times and locations, such as the Cretaceous Period, outer space, and inside a human body.

History 
The first medium in which this franchise was developed was the Magic School Bus book series. Craig Walker, vice-president and senior editorial director at Scholastic Co., stated that the concept began with the idea of combining science with fictional stories, and Joanna Cole (who had written both science and humor before) and Bruce Degen were then approached with creating such a series. Walker also states that his own memories of school field trips and of a teacher he had once, served as further inspiration. The first book, The Magic School Bus at the Waterworks, was published in 1986. The books are written in the first person from the point of view of an unnamed student in "the Friz's" class.

Cole and Degen started a new series called Ms. Frizzle's Adventures in 2001, which teaches social studies, eventually producing three books in that series. Microsoft Home began publishing Magic School Bus software in 1994, the same year The Magic School Bus concept was also adapted into an animated television series of the same name by Scholastic Entertainment. The series premiered on September 10, 1994, with its theme song performed by Little Richard. Scholastic Entertainment president Deborah Forte says that adapting the books into an animated series was an opportunity to help kids "learn about science in a fun way". Around that time, Forte had been hearing concern from parents and teachers about how to improve science education for girls and minorities. As noted by Marcel LaFollette, "accomplished women were exceptions in a universe of male luminaries" when it came to science television. Ms. Valerie Frizzle, the magic school teacher, was the closest approximation to an expert female host. She was voiced by Lily Tomlin in the series.

Scholastic Entertainment, the American Meteorological Society and the Children's Museum of Houston created a Scholastic's the Magic School Bus Kicks Up a Storm, a  traveling exhibit funded in part by the National Science Foundation, which premiered at the Children's Museum of Houston in 2003 (a copy of it opened in New Jersey the month after that).

See also

 The Magic School Bus – The first animated series based on the books
 The Magic School Bus Rides Again – A revival of the animated series, by Scholastic and Netflix

References

 
Mass media franchises introduced in 1986
Fictional vehicles
Scholastic franchises